Bucharest Corporate Center also known as the Generali Tower is a class A office building in Bucharest. It has 15 floors and a surface of 18,000 m2. The building is owned by the real estate branch of insurance giants Assicurazioni Generali.

See also
List of tallest buildings in Romania

References

External links

Skyscraper office buildings in Bucharest
Office buildings completed in 2007